Keister House is a historic home located at Blacksburg, Montgomery County, Virginia.  It was built in the 1830s, and is a two-story, four-bay brick two-room-plan house. It has exterior end chimneys and a hipped roof front porch. The property was owned by the Keister Family from 1800 until a 1935 foreclosure.

A family room was added to the rear of the house in 1971. 

It was listed on the National Register of Historic Places in 1989.

References

Houses on the National Register of Historic Places in Virginia
Houses completed in 1835
Houses in Montgomery County, Virginia
Buildings and structures in Blacksburg, Virginia
National Register of Historic Places in Montgomery County, Virginia